The 2008 Swiss Open Super Series was the fourth tournament of 2008 BWF Super Series badminton tournament. It was held from March 11 to March 16, 2008 in Basel, Switzerland.

Seeds

Men's singles
 Lin Dan     
 Lee Chong Wei
 Bao Chunlai
 Chen Jin
 Kenneth Jonassen
 Sony Dwi Kuncoro
 Taufik Hidayat
 Peter Gade

Women's singles
 Xie Xingfang
 Zhang Ning
 Lu Lan
 Zhu Lin
 Pi Hongyan
 Wang Chen
 Xu Huaiwen
 Wong Mew Choo

Men's doubles
 Cai Yun / Fu Haifeng
 Markis Kido / Hendra Setiawan
 Koo Kien Keat / Tan Boon Heong
 Choong Tan Fook / Lee Wan Wah
 Tony Gunawan /  Candra Wijaya
 Jung Jae-sung / Lee Yong-dae
 Jens Eriksen / Martin Lundgaard Hansen
 Luluk Hadiyanto / Alvent Yulianto

Women's doubles
 Wei Yili / Zhang Yawen
 Yang Wei / Zhang Jiewen
 Du Jing / Yu Yang
 Lee Hyo-jung / Lee Kyung-won
 Gao Ling / Zhao Tingting
 Cheng Wen-hsing / Chien Yu-chin
 Kumiko Ogura / Reiko Shiota
 Gail Emms	/ Donna Kellogg

Mixed doubles
 Zheng Bo / Gao Ling
 Nova Widianto / Liliyana Natsir
 Flandy Limpele / Vita Marissa
 Xie Zhongbo / Zhang Yawen
 He Hanbin	/ Yu Yang
 Lee Yong-dae / Lee Hyo-jung
 Sudket Prapakamol / Saralee Thungthongkam
 Nathan Robertson / Gail Emms

Results

Men's singles

Others

Semi-finals

Finals

External links
Badminton Swiss Open at tournamentsoftware.com

Swiss Open (badminton)
Open Super Series
Swiss Open
Sports competitions in Basel
Münchenstein